The Wild Rogue Wilderness is a wilderness area surrounding the  Wild and Scenic portion of the Rogue River in southwestern Oregon, U.S. to protect the watershed.  The wilderness was established in 1978 and now comprises .  Because it spans part of the Rogue River-Siskiyou National Forest and the Medford district of the Bureau of Land Management (BLM), the Wild Rogue Wilderness is administered by both the BLM and the Forest Service.

History
The lure of gold in the 1850s attracted many miners, hunters, and stocker raisers.  Conflicts between white settlers and Native Americans culminated in the Rogue River Wars of 1855–56. After their defeat, Native Americans were taken to reservations.  Mining remnants such as pipe, flumes, trestles, and stamp mills can still be found in the wilderness.

Expansion
The proposal has been introduced multiple times in the U.S. Congress by Oregon's elected officials.

Management
The Wild Rogue Wilderness is unusual in that the management of the Wild and Scenic River permits motorboat operation and lodge construction for accommodation.  This would not normally be allowed in a designated wilderness area.

Biology
Otters and salmon, including steelhead, inhabit the Rogue River within the wilderness, and black bears, ospreys, and great blue herons feed on the fish. Lizards, ticks, and rattlesnakes can be found in grassy areas above the river.

Recreation

Popular recreation activities in the Wild Rogue Wilderness include hiking, camping, rock climbing, fishing, and whitewater rafting.  The Rogue River is one of the most popular whitewater runs in the world because of a steady water level due to upstream dams, sunny summer weather, and scenic forests and steep canyons.

There are several hiking trails in the Wild Rogue, including the Rogue River National Recreation Trail, the Panther Ridge Trail along the northern border of the wilderness, and the Mule Creek Trail on the BLM portion of the wilderness.  The Blossom fire of 2005 destroyed some of the hiking trails, which were still closed at the end of 2007.

See also
 List of Oregon Wildernesses
 Wilderness Act

References

External links

 Wild Rogue Wilderness - Rogue River-Siskiyou National Forest
 Save the Wild Rogue - Environmental group
 "To save the Rogue River, its wilderness area must be expanded" by Todd Weck and Chris Daughters, Eugene Register-Guard, February 1, 2008
 Wild Rogue Wilderness Area - BLM page

Rogue River-Siskiyou National Forest
Protected areas of Coos County, Oregon
Protected areas of Curry County, Oregon
Wilderness areas of Oregon
Bureau of Land Management wilderness areas in Oregon
1987 establishments in Oregon
Protected areas established in 1987